The Ipswich State Bank, located at 1st Ave. and Main St. in Ipswich, South Dakota, was built in 1905.  It was listed on the National Register of Historic Places in 1978.

It is a two-story native stone building with quoins, with elements of Classical Revival style.

It was deemed "the best example of a neo-classic revival commercial building in Ipswich, South Dakota. It also has been the center of many of the most important financial transactions of the area, and as the home of Marcus P. Beebe's land offices, it was significant in the development of the area."

References

Bank buildings on the National Register of Historic Places in South Dakota
Neoclassical architecture in South Dakota
Commercial buildings completed in 1900
Edmunds County, South Dakota